1080 Orchis, provisional designation , is an dark background asteroid from the inner regions of the asteroid belt. It was discovered on 30 August 1927, by German astronomer Karl Reinmuth at the Heidelberg Observatory in southwest Germany. It was named after the flowering plant Orchis.

Orbit and classification 

Orchis is a non-family asteroid of the main belt's background population. It orbits the Sun in the inner asteroid belt at a distance of 1.8–3.0 AU once every 3 years and 9 months (1,374 days; semi-major axis of 2.42 AU). Its orbit has an eccentricity of 0.26 and an inclination of 5° with respect to the ecliptic. The body's observation arc begins with its official discovery observation in August 1927.

Naming 

This minor planet was named after the flowering plant Orchis, a genus in the orchid family. The official naming citation was mentioned in The Names of the Minor Planets by Paul Herget in 1955.

Reinmuth's flowers 

Due to his many discoveries, Karl Reinmuth submitted a large list of 66 newly named asteroids in the early 1930s. This list also contained a sequence of 28 asteroids, starting with 1054 Forsytia, that were all named after plants, in particular flowering plants (also see list of minor planets named after animals and plants).

Physical characteristics 

In the Tholen classification, Orchis is an uncommon F-type asteroid, a type which belongs to the wider C-complex of carbonaceous asteroids.

Rotation period and poles 

In 2010, three rotational lightcurves of Orchis were obtained from photometric observations. Lightcurve analysis gave a rotation period of 16.061, 16.075 and 16.1 hours with a brightness amplitude of between 0.23 and 0.31 magnitude. A modeled lightcurve based on optical data from a large collaboration network found a concurring period of 16.0657 hours and two spin axis of (255.0°, 27.0°) and (71.0°, 28.0°) in ecliptic coordinates (λ, β).

Diameter and albedo 

According to the surveys carried out by the Infrared Astronomical Satellite IRAS, the Japanese Akari satellite and the NEOWISE mission of NASA's Wide-field Infrared Survey Explorer, Orchis measures between 20.755 and 24.62 kilometers in diameter and its surface has an albedo between 0.029 and 0.051. The Collaborative Asteroid Lightcurve Link adopts the results obtained by IRAS, that is, an albedo of 0.0430 and a diameter of 23.28 kilometers based on an absolute magnitude of 12.2.

References

External links 
 Lightcurve Database Query (LCDB), at www.minorplanet.info
 Dictionary of Minor Planet Names, Google books
 Asteroids and comets rotation curves, CdR – Geneva Observatory, Raoul Behrend
 Discovery Circumstances: Numbered Minor Planets (1)-(5000) – Minor Planet Center
 
 

001080
Discoveries by Karl Wilhelm Reinmuth
Named minor planets
001080
19270830